This is a list of schools in the London Borough of Wandsworth, England.

State-funded schools

Primary schools

Albemarle Primary School
Alderbrook Primary School
All Saints CE Primary School
Allfarthing Primary School
The Alton School
Anglo Portuguese School of London
Ark John Archer Primary Academy
Beatrix Potter Primary School
Belleville Primary School
Belleville Wix Academy
Brandlehow School
Broadwater Primary School
Chesterton Primary School
Christchurch CE Primary School
Earlsfield Primary School
Falconbrook Primary School
Fircroft Primary School
Floreat Wandsworth Primary School 
Franciscan Primary School
Furzedown Primary School
Gatton Primary School
Goldfinch Primary School
Granard Primary School
Griffin Primary School
Heathmere Primary School
Hillbrook School
Holy Ghost RC Primary School
Honeywell Infant School
Honeywell Junior School
Hotham Primary School
John Burns Primary School
Mosaic Jewish Primary School
Oasis Academy Putney
Our Lady of Victories RC Primary School
Our Lady Queen of Heaven RC Primary School
Penwortham Primary School
Ravenstone Primary School
Riversdale Primary School
Roehampton CE Primary School
Ronald Ross Primary School
Rutherford House School
Sacred Heart RC Primary School, Battersea
Sacred Heart RC Primary School, Roehampton
St Anne's CE Primary School
St Anselm's RC Primary School
St Boniface RC Primary School
St Faith's CE Primary School
St George's CE Primary School
St Joseph's RC Primary School
St Mary's CE Primary School
St Mary's RC Primary School
St Michael's CE Primary School
Sellincourt Primary School
Shaftesbury Park Primary School
Sheringdale Primary School
Smallwood Primary School
Southmead Primary School
Swaffield School
Tooting Primary School
Trinity St Mary's CE Primary School
West Hill Primary School
Westbridge Academy

Secondary schools

Ark Bolingbroke Academy
Ark Putney Academy
Ashcroft Technology Academy 
Burntwood School 
Chestnut Grove Academy
Ernest Bevin Academy
Graveney School
Harris Academy Battersea
Saint Cecilia's Church of England School 
St John Bosco College 
Southfields Academy

Special and alternative schools

Bradstow School
Francis Barber Pupil Referral Unit
Garratt Park School
Greenmead School
Linden Lodge School
Nightingale Community Academy
Oak Lodge School
Paddock School
Victoria Drive Primary Pupil Referral Unit
Wandsworth Hospital and Home Tuition Service

Further education
St Francis Xavier Sixth Form College
South Thames College

Independent schools

Primary and preparatory schools

Broomwood Hall School
Dolphin School
Eaton House The Manor School
Eveline Day School
Falcons School for Girls
Finton House School
Hornsby House School
Hurlingham School
L'Ecole de Battersea
Merlin School	
Newton Preparatory School 
Northcote Lodge School
Parkgate House School
Prospect House School
The Roche School
Thomas's London Day School
Wandsworth Preparatory School

Senior and all-through schools
Al Risalah Boys' School
Al Risalah Secondary School
Emanuel School
Ibstock Place School
Putney High School
Thames Christian School

Special and alternative schools
Centre Academy London
The Chelsea Group of Children
The Dominie School
Park House School
The Priory Lodge School
The Priory Roehampton Hospital School
Tram House School

External links
Wandsworth Borough Council - Schools and Colleges

Wandsworth
Schools in the London Borough of Wandsworth